Sir John Martin Kirby Laing  (born 18 January 1942) is a British entrepreneur in the construction industry.

Martin Laing was executive chairman of John Laing plc, the firm founded by his great-great-grandfather James Laing (1816–1882), but resigned in 2001 when the company faced major losses in its construction business, ending 152 years and five generations of family management.

The son of Sir William Kirby Laing (1916-2009) and the grandson of Sir John William Laing (1879–1978), he was educated at St. Lawrence College, Ramsgate and Emmanuel College, Cambridge. In 1985, he succeeded his father Sir Kirby Laing as chairman of John Laing plc. His uncle, Sir Maurice Laing, had also been chairman.

He was knighted in the New Year Honours 1997 for services to the construction industry.

In the Sunday Times Rich List 2008 ranking of the wealthiest people in the UK he was placed 472nd with an estimated fortune of £175 million.

References

Sources
Burke's Peerage

1942 births
Living people
Presidents of the Smeatonian Society of Civil Engineers
British businesspeople
Businesspeople awarded knighthoods
Knights Bachelor
People educated at St Lawrence College, Ramsgate
Alumni of Emmanuel College, Cambridge
Commanders of the Order of the British Empire
Deputy Lieutenants of Hertfordshire